The Hindu Heritage Summer Camp, founded in 1976,  is located in Macedon, New York.

Background
The camp was founded  by Devi Parvati, a convert to Hinduism. It began with six tents at a location in the Pocono Mountains of Pennsylvania. During the 1990s it moved to Macedon, where it could utilize the facilities of the India Community Center for the Rochester area.

Morning reveille at the camp is blown on a conch shell in homage to Vishnu, who is often depicted carrying one, In addition to traditional summer camp activities such as drama and arts and crafts, campers are offered classes on Hindu philosophy, play Cricket, and learn the garba, a traditional dance from Gujarat. The most recent director of the summer camp was Anjali Patel, who is also from Gujarat; she was mentored by the previous assistant director, Esha Ponnuri.

References

External links
 

Summer camps in New York (state)
Hinduism in New York (state)